Kiyotake (written: 清武 or 清健) is both a Japanese surname and a masculine Japanese given name. Notable people with the name include:

Surname:
 (born 1960), Japanese video game designer
 (born 1989), Japanese footballer
 (born 1991), Japanese footballer

Given name:
 (1892–1961), Japanese general

See also
, former town in Miyazaki District, Miyazaki Prefecture, Japan
, train station in Miyazaki Prefecture

Japanese-language surnames
Japanese masculine given names